Miss Grand Costa Rica is a San José-based female national beauty pageant in Costa Rica, organized separately for in first time in 2022 by the  (CNB Costa Rica), with Erick Solis as the president. The winner of the contest represents the country at its parent competition, the Miss Grand International pageant. Before 2022, the competition license belonged to different organizers, such as the Reinas de Costa Rica organization (2015 – 2017) and the Miss Costa Rica organization (2018 – 2021). Most of the country's representatives at the Miss Grand International pageant during such a period were appointed without organizing the respective pageant.

Since its first participation at Miss Grand International in 2014, Costa Rica has never won the contest but has a record of five placements, including the top 10 finalists in 2015 and 2021, and the top 20 finalists in 2017, 2018, and 2019.

History
Costa Rica has joined the Miss Grand International pageant annually since 2014. However, most of its representatives were appointed to participate without organizing the national contest. In 2020, two years after taking over the franchise from the Reinas de Costa Rica organization, the organizer team related to the Miss Costa Rica organization, led by Gerson Jiménez, ran the pageant reality show "The Finalists," which was aired on Telenovela, to determine country representatives for Miss Grand International,  Top Model of the World, Miss Asia Pacific International, and Miss International. The pageant delegates were chosen through regional casting in various locations throughout the country, including Guanacaste, Limón, Alajuela, and San José, with Gabriela Jara Cordero of Limón being chosen as the country representative for the  pageant, outperforming the other 13 national aspirants.

Previously, the franchise belonged to Olais Antonio Padilla and the Reinas de Costa Rica organization in 2014 and 2015 - 2017, respectively. Padilla planned to organize the first Miss Grand Costa Rica contest the following year after sending a delegate to the Miss Grand International 2014 but lost the franchise to the Reinas de Costa Rica organization before completing such a willingness.

In 2022, after four consecutive years of serving as the national licensee, Jiménez lost the franchise to the organization chaired by Erick Solis,  (CNB Costa Rica), which conducted the inaugural edition of Miss Grand Costa Rica that year. The contest was held at the Eugene O'Neill Theatre in San José, featuring 12 national finalists, who were directly chosen to compete by the central organizer through online screening, of whom a 28-year-old girl from Guanacaste, Brenda Muñoz, was named the winner. 

Costa Rica has five placements in the Miss Grand International pageant, including the top 10 finalists in 2015 and 2021, and the top 20 finalists in 2017, 2018, and 2019.

Editions
The following list is the edition detail of the Miss Grand Costa Rica contest, since its inception in 2022.

Representatives at Miss Grand International
Color keys

Gallery

References

External links

 

Grand Costa Rica
Recurring events established in 2022